Harrison Robledo (born February 8, 2002) is an American professional soccer player who plays as a midfielder for USL Championship club Indy Eleven, on loan from FC Cincinnati.

Youth career 
Robledo spent four years in the New York City FC academy, helping the team win the 2016 Generation Adidas cup with the club's U-16 team and played with the U-18/19 Development National Championship team. He moved to the FC Cincinnati academy in 2020 and traveled with the FC Cincinnati squad during their 2022 preseason camp.

Professional career
On February 25, 2022, FC Cincinnati sent New York City FC $50,000 of General Allocation Money to acquire Robledo's MLS rights, and signed him to a homegrown player contract with the club the day before the start of the 2022 season. He made his professional debut on February 26, 2022, appearing as a 61st-minute substitute during a 5–0 loss against Austin FC.

References

External links
 Profile at FC Cincinnati

2002 births
Living people
American soccer players
American expatriate soccer players
FC Cincinnati players
FC Cincinnati 2 players
Indy Eleven players
Association football midfielders
Homegrown Players (MLS)
Major League Soccer players
MLS Next Pro players
USL Championship players
Sportspeople from Queens, New York
Soccer players from New York City